is a Japanese anime television series. The series is animated using the program MikuMikuDance. The series began airing on NTV in October 2013. A second season titled  aired from January 12, 2014. A manga illustrated by Kotora Suzune is published online on Manga Life Win by Takeshobo. The third season is a collaboration with Ryū Jikō and Kidani L's manga Minarai Megami: Puru Purun Charm, which is published in Monthly Shōnen Sirius, and titled . Instead of each episode being 15 minutes as with the previous two seasons, the length of each episode is 30 minutes long to match the format of most TV anime.

Plot
Koharu Tanaka joins an unusual club, in which the members brainstorm alternative club activities, drawing on common tropes from anime genres.

Characters

Tesaguri club

Third year student at Tousei High School. The club president, and wears a flower badge as a sign of this. Kikokushijo from Poland. Very strong enthusiasm and leadership skills.

Third year student at Tousei High School. The club vice-president. Childhood friend of Yua. Wears a headband with a flower attached to it. Has a calm, intellectual personality. Nicknamed "Hīna" by other club members.

Second year student at Tousei High School. Very direct and tends to badmouth, often using negative terms such as "annoying" when discussing other clubs.

First year student at Tousei High School. Nicknamed "Koharun" by other club members. Wanting to join a club in high school but unable to decide which one to join, she was roped into the Tesaguri club because she "looked like a tsukkomi". Due to being raised by her grandmother, her tastes are a bit outdated.

The former club president. One year senior to Yua and Hina and previous president of the Tesaguri club. Introduced Aoi into the club. Largehearted and cares greatly for the other club members.
Appears in season two in the twelfth episode (with a brief glimpse in episode eight) and in season three in the fifth and twelfth episodes.

Other

"Puru Purun Charm" characters

Episode list

Season 1

Tesagure! Bukatsu-mono Encore (Season 2)

Tesagure! Bukatsumono Spin-off Purupurun Sharumu to Asobou (Season 3)

References

External links
Official anime website 
Official manga website 

Anime with original screenplays
Manga Life Win manga
Nippon TV original programming
Seinen manga
Slice of life anime and manga
Takeshobo manga
Yaoyorozu